An exhaust air heat pump (EAHP) extracts heat from the exhaust air of a building and transfers the heat to the supply air, hot tap water and/or hydronic heating system (underfloor heating, radiators). This requires at least mechanical exhaust but mechanical supply is optional; see mechanical ventilation. This type of heat pump requires a certain air exchange rate to maintain its output power. Since the inside air is approximately 20–22 degrees Celsius all year round, the maximum output power of the heat pump is not varying with the seasons and outdoor temperature.

Air leaving the building when the heat pump's compressor is running is usually at around −1° in most versions. Thus, the unit is extracting heat from the air that needs to be changed (at a rate of around a half an air change per hour). Air entering the house is of course generally warmer than the air processed through the unit so there is a net 'gain'. Care must be taken that these are only used in the correct type of houses. Exhaust air heat pumps have minimum flow rates so that when installed in a small flat, the airflow chronically over-ventilates the flat and increases the heat loss by drawing in large amounts of unwanted outside air. There are some models though that can take in additional outdoor air to negate this and this air is also feed to the compressor to avoid over ventilation.For most earlier exhaust air heat pumps there will be a low heat output to the hot water and heating of just around 1.8kW from the compressor/heat pump process, but if that falls short of the building's requirements additional heat will be automatically triggered in the form of immersion heaters or an external gas boiler. The immersion heater top-up could  be substantial ( if you select the wrong unit) , and when a unit with a 6 kW immersion heater operates at the full output it will cost £1 per hour to run.

NIBE
F200P 
 Discontinued
F360P 
 Discontinued
F205 F370 F470

F750

F730

Issues
Between 2009 and 2013, some 15,000 brand new social homes were built in the UK with NIBE EAHPs used as primary heating. Owners and housing association tenants reported crippling electric bills. High running costs are usual with exhaust air heat pumps and should be expected, due to the very small heat recovery with these units. Typically the ventilation air stream is around 31 litres per second and the heat recovery is 750W and no more.
All additional heat necessary to provide heating and hot water is from electricity, either compressor electrical input or immersion heater.
At outside temperatures below 0 degrees Celsius, this type of heat pump removes more heat from a home than it supplies. Over a year around 60% of the energy input to a property with an exhaust air heat pump will be from electricity.

Many families are still battling with developers to have their EAHP systems replaced with more reliable and efficient heating, noting the success of residents in Coventry.

References

External links
NIBE Energy Systems UK

Heat pumps